Donald Joseph Barry (June 23, 1931 – May 30, 2014) was a Canadian football player who played for the Edmonton Eskimos. He won the Grey Cup with them in 1954, 1955 and 1956. Barry was born in Edmonton  He was inducted into the Alberta Sports Hall of Fame in 2007 and the City of Edmonton's Hall of Fame in 2010. Don also contributed to Canadian football as a coach in Edmonton:  St. Joseph’s High School; St. Anthony’s College, Edmonton Huskies, Edmonton Wildcats, and the University of Alberta Golden Bears (1967-1979: earning two Vanier Cups).  He was proud to have been a guest coach (Offensive Line) in the 1987 CFL Players Association All-Star Game. He was married to Susan Kay Middlemiss in 1991. They later retired to Canmore, Alberta where he died in 2014.

References

1931 births
2014 deaths
Edmonton Elks players
Players of Canadian football from Alberta
Canadian football people from Edmonton
Alberta Sports Hall of Fame inductees